Neidalia is a genus of moths in the family Erebidae. The genus was erected by George Hampson in 1901.

Species
Neidalia bifasciata (Cramer, [1779])
Neidalia cerdai Toulgoët, 1997
Neidalia dulcicula Schaus, 1929
Neidalia dognini
Neidalia eurygania (Druce, 1897)
Neidalia irrorata Rothschild, 1917
Neidalia ockendeni
Neidalia orientalis
Neidalia villacresi

References

External links

Moth genera
Phaegopterina